Johan Harald Gedda (1869-1948) was a Swedish Dragon class sailor. He won the 1939 Dragon Gold Cup. He was the father of Swedish sailor Per Gedda.

References

Swedish male sailors (sport)
Dragon class sailors
1869 births
1948 deaths